Blood of the Valiant is a 1998 role-playing game supplement for Feng Shui published by Ronin Publishing.

Contents
Blood of the Valiant is a sourcebook presenting the history, philosophy, and organization of the Guiding Hand faction.

Publication history
Chris Pramas had written Blood of the Valiant for Daedalus Entertainment, but the company never published it or even sent him a contract due to their own financial difficulties, but the supplement was later licensed to Ronin Publishing who were able to publish it in 1998 as their second and final book.

Reception
The reviewer from the online second volume of Pyramid stated that "this book expands upon the Guiding Hand, one of a number of time-traveling cabals seeking to control the world through the mystical powers of oriental Feng Shui. This Guiding Hand sourcebook is well thought out and very useful, but not without a few very minor flaws."

Reviews
Shadis #52 (Oct., 1998)

References

Role-playing game books
Role-playing game supplements introduced in 1998